Chal-e Kuchek Latif Allah (also Romanized as Chāl-e Kūchek Laṭif Allah) is a village in Qaleh-ye Khvajeh Rural District, in the Central District of Andika County, Khuzestan Province, Iran. At the 2006 census, its population was 64, in 13 families.

References 

Populated places in Andika County